María Alejandra Borrero Saa (born April 25, 1962) is a Colombian actress of film, stage and television.

Personal life
Born of a traditional family from Popayán, Borrero establishes a liberal life, where she manifests to be very different from the traditional standards which involved her in the world of acting.

In 1998, after years of work in Colombian television, she came out as lesbian, an issue that according to her was not well accepted by the country and caused her depression for four years. She decided to move to the United States, questioning how in Colombia there was no respect for difference. Four years after announcing her homosexuality, she returned to her homeland and agreed to interview her sexual orientation, concluding that little by little, society was already accepting sexual diversity. In 2015, she stated that she had a relationship with Katrin Nyfeler, is engaged to get married.

While occasionally described as an atheist by the Colombian media, Borrero has publicly stated that while she is against organized religion, she does believe in God.

Filmography

Television

Film

Theater

References

External links 

1962 births
Living people
20th-century Colombian actresses
21st-century Colombian actresses
Colombian film actresses
Colombian stage actresses
Colombian telenovela actresses
Lesbian actresses
Colombian LGBT actors
People from Popayán
21st-century Colombian LGBT people